Helemano is a census-designated place (CDP) in Honolulu County, Hawaii, United States.

The community was first listed as a CDP prior to the 2020 census.

Demographics

References 

Census-designated places in Honolulu County, Hawaii
Census-designated places in Hawaii